= Ngaled =

Town in Indonesia

Coordinates: 6°26′S 106°34′E

Ngaled is a small town in Indonesia. It is 1.8 km (1.1 mi) east of Nanggung Satu.

== Transport ==
The closest airport is Jakarta Soekarno-Hatta International which is 35.4 km (22.0 mi) north of Ngaled.
